Peter de Rome (28 June 1924 – 21 June 2014) was a writer, photographer, and director of gay-themed, erotic films. De Rome was born in Juan-les-Pins, Côte d'Azur, France, grew up in England, and became an American citizen in 1997.

Career
De Rome volunteered in 1943 for the Royal Air Force and served in France, Belgium and Germany in World War II. Returning to civilian life in 1947, he started an acting career with the Birmingham Repertory Theatre, then switched to films, becoming a publicist, first with J. Arthur Rank, then with Sir Alexander Korda and later with David O. Selznick for whom he worked on The Third Man (1949) in Vienna, and then on Terminal Station (1953) in Rome (released in the U.S. as Indiscretion of an American Wife).

In 1956, he emigrated to the U.S. and first joined Tiffany & Company as a salesman, then left in 1963 to work in the Civil Rights Movement in the south with his good friend, actress Madeleine Sherwood. During this period, he made his first movie, a short documentary entitled New Orleans. Returning to New York, he made a succession of gay erotic shorts culminating with Hot Pants, which won a first prize in 1971 at the Wet Dream Film Festival in Amsterdam. This in turn led to a suggestion from producer Jack Deveau to select eight of de Rome's movies to be released commercially as The Erotic Films of Peter de Rome. These shorts opened to critical acclaim at Lincoln Center in NYC, and later ran successfully in most large cities across the U.S. 

In 1974, de Rome went to Paris to make his first full-length feature entitled Adam & Yves, which was followed in 1976 by The Destroying Angel, an exercise in gay horror, supposedly based on Edgar Allan Poe, and using a title similar to Exterminating Angel (1962) by Luis Buñuel. However, with the advent of HIV/AIDS in the early 80s, de Rome ceased making movies. 

During this time de Rome worked in publicity for Paramount Pictures, retiring in 1989. In 1997 de Rome became a U.S. citizen.   His films had never been shown in the UK, but in 2007 under a new government, the British Film Institute (BFI) requested a selection of de Rome's films to be held in their Archive and to be shown later that year at the London Lesbian & Gay Film Festival. This program included a 45-minute documentary made by David McGillivray called Peter de Rome: Grandfather of Gay Porn, and proved so successful that the BFI released the whole program on DVD.

A full-length documentary entitled Peter de Rome: Grandfather of Gay Porn was produced in de Rome's 90th year. The film was screened at the Sheffield Documentary Festival. He fell ill and died at his home in Sandwich, Kent on 21 June 2014, a week before his 90th birthday.

Partial filmography

Short films

New Orleans (1964)
Shower (1965)
The Fire Island Story (1965)
Scopo (1966)
Boogaloo (1966)
Double Exposure (1969)
Encounter (1970)
Green Thoughts (1970)
The Second Coming (1970)
In Camera (1977)
Brown Study (1979)
Help Wanted (1971)
Moulage (1971)
Mumbo Jumbo (1971)
Prometheus (1972)
Daydreams from a Crosstown Bus (1972)
Underground (1972)
Kensington Gorey (1973/2013)
The Box (1974)
Badedas (1976)
Marathon (1979)

Feature films
The Erotic Films of Peter De Rome  (1973)
Adam & Yves (1974)
The Destroying Angel (1976)

Documentaries
Fragments: The Incomplete Films of Peter de Rome  (2011)
Peter de Rome: Grandfather of Gay Porn (2013)

Bibliography
The Erotic World of Peter de Rome (Alyson Publications, 1984) – autobiography

References

External links
 
 
 The Erotic Films of Peter de Rome at British Film Institute
 Video Interview: Musings love and passion in the cinema at British Film Institute

2014 deaths
1924 births
American photographers
American pornographic film directors
French photographers
French pornographic film directors
Directors of gay pornographic films
French emigrants to the United States